Dubna is a river in Vladimir Oblast and Moscow Oblast in Russia, a right tributary of the Volga. The length of the river is 167 kilometres. The area of its basin is 5,350 km². Its largest tributary is the Sestra. The town of Dubna is located at the confluence of the Dubna and Volga rivers.

References 

Rivers of Vladimir Oblast
Rivers of Moscow Oblast